The Ivano-Frankivsk Oblast Council is the regional oblast council (parliament) of the Ivano-Frankivsk Oblast (province) located in western Ukraine.

Council members are elected for five year terms. In order to gain representation in the council, a party must gain more than 5 percent of the total vote.

Recent elections

2020
Distribution of seats after the 2020 Ukrainian local elections

Election date was 25 October 2020

2015
Distribution of seats after the 2015 Ukrainian local elections

Election date was 25 October 2015

Leaders of the region

Head of the council
 1939 – 1941 Maksym Kozenko
 1941 – 1944 Nazi occupation
 1944 – 1945 Maksym Kozenko
 1945 – 1946 Ivan Ryasychenko
 1946 – 1949 Filip Scherbak
 1949 – 1952 Yukhym Kobzin
 1952 – 1955 Yuriy Pantelyuk
 1955 – 1979 Petro Kaikan
 1979 – 1990 Vadym Boichuk
 1990 – 1992 Mykola Yakovyna
 1992 – 1998 Stepan Volkovetsky
 1998 – 2002 Zinoviy Mytnyk
 2002 – 2006 Vasyl Brus
 2006 – 2010 Ihor Oliynyk
 2010 – 2012 Oleksandr Sych
 2012 – 2015 Vasyl Skrypnychuk
 2015 –  Oleksandr Sych

Head of the executive committee
 1939 – 1941 Maksym Kozenko
 1941 – 1944 Nazi occupation
 1944 – 1945 Maksym Kozenko
 1945 – 1946 Ivan Ryasychenko
 1946 – 1949 Filip Scherbak
 1949 – 1952 Yukhym Kobzin
 1952 – 1955 Yuriy Pantelyuk
 1955 – 1979 Petro Kaikan
 1979 – 1990 Vadym Boichuk
 1990 – 1990 Dmytro Zakharuk
 1990 – 1991 Vasyl Pavlyk
 1991 – 1992 Mykola Yakovyna
 1992 – 1995 representative of the President of Ukraine
 1995 – 1996 Stepan Volkovetsky
 Since 1996 replaced with head of the Regional State Administration

References

Council
Regional legislatures of Ukraine
Unicameral legislatures